Graham Lee (born 16 December 1975 in Galway, Ireland) is a successful Irish jockey, operating in Great Britain and Ireland. He was initially a National Hunt jockey, but changed codes mid-career and now operates as a flat jockey.

National Hunt career

Lee joined the team of trainer Howard Johnson permanently in 2002, after leaving the stables of Malcolm Jefferson and was largely responsible for the schooling and on-track development of horses owned by Graham Wylie including Inglis Drever, No Refuge and Arcalis.

Lee held freelance status, and rode for many other trainers during these years, most notably Ginger McCain. 
In an autumn meeting of 2003 at Wetherby Racecourse, Lee achieved one of his most famous feats, by winning a quintuple of races. This achievement secured a win of over £500,000 on a fivefold accumulator bet.
 
After managing to take third place with the horse in the 2003 race, in 2004 Lee won the Grand National on Amberleigh House. The horse was trained by Ginger McCain, who famously trained three-time winner Red Rum. The success could not be repeated, however, as the horse achieved only tenth place in 2005, and was finally retired after being pulled up at the 21st fence in 2006.

Victorious in the Scottish National in 2004, by riding topweight Grey Abbey to win by a distance Lee became one of only three jockeys, along with Brian Fletcher and Ruby Walsh, to achieve a "Grand National Double".

Lee spent a lot of his time working with former Middlesbrough FC fitness coach Chris Barnes working in the gym improving on fitness and injury recovery times.

Lee missed the 2006 Scottish National due to a virus, which would eventually end his relationship with Howard Johnson for whom he had been the main stable jockey. He was replaced by Paddy Brennan. Lee then became the main stable jockey and deputy trainer for Ferdy Murphy, where he would remain until March 2012. He was second in the 2007 Scottish National on Nine De Sivola and missing out by just half a length, as in the Irish Grand National of the same year.

Lee rode favourite Joe's Edge in the 2007 National, but pulled up at the 20th fence after failing to trouble the leaders. He was scheduled to ride Idle Talk for Donald McCain, the son of Ginger McCain, in the 2008 Grand National, however he was ruled out after sustaining multiple fractures to the jaw several weeks earlier.

Although his profile dipped sharply after joining Murphy, he came back into the sport's consciousness through his involvement with several improving chasers and hurdlers, and moved into second place in the 2007–08 jockeys championship. In so doing he also became only the fourth National Hunt jockey to be placed in the first two positions in the National Hunt Jockeys' Championship in ten years (following Robert Thornton, Richard Johnson and Timmy Murphy), at the time displacing Richard Johnson.

In 2009, Lee began riding for newly licensed trainer Rose Dobbin, wife of jockey Tony Dobbin, in addition to his work for Murphy. Lee was a surprise choice to ride for David Pipe in the 2010 Grand National, eventually being selected to ride The Package after Timmy Murphy chose to ride his National-winning horse, Comply or Die.

He rode his 1000th career winner on 7 January 2012.

Previous stables

Noel Meade – After a successful stint on the Irish pony circuit, Lee left school at the age of 15 to join the stable.

Dessie McDonogh – Based in County Meath, this was Lee's last position in Ireland before moving to England.

Mary Reveley – During this stint, Lee was a minor jockey, not riding many high-profile horses. He also suffered a serious knee injury, from which it took more than seven months to recover.

Bill Haigh – Here, recovering from his severe injury problems, Lee rose to the top ten in the jockey championship.

Malcolm Jefferson – A successful stint for Lee which secured him the lucrative position with Howard Johnson, and fifth place in the jockey championship. In 2010, Lee began riding for Jefferson again.

J Howard Johnson – With this stable, Lee secured the top jockey award at Cheltenham and a Scottish Grand National win. He finished third in the jockey championship, behind Tony McCoy and Richard Johnson. He also won the Grand National during this period, but this was for Ginger McCain.

Ferdy Murphy – Following his acrimonious departure from the stables of Howard Johnson, Lee became stable jockey and later a deputy trainer for Ferdy Murphy. He rode here for six years before making the decision to move into flat racing.

Personal life

Lee comes from a very sporting family. His grandfather, Matthew Lee, played for Kilmarnock FC as well as being capped for his national team. His brother, Malcolm Lee was a flat jockey, as is his cousin Dean Mernagh.

He is a close friend of champion jockey, Tony McCoy, with whom he had lodged in the past. He is married with a daughter called Allan and a son, and lives in Bedale, North Yorkshire..

Grand National record 
2003: Amberleigh House (3rd) – Ginger McCain
2004: Amberleigh House (1st) – Ginger McCain
2005: Amberleigh House (10th) – Ginger McCain
2006: Amberleigh House (P21) – Ginger McCain
2007: Joe's Edge (P20) – Ferdy Murphy
2008: Did not enter (injured)
2009: Kilbeggan Blade (P21) – Tom George
2010: The Package (U19) – David Pipe
2011: Big Fella Thanks (7th) – Ferdy Murphy

Flat career
Following a series of serious injuries he announced that he would switch from National Hunt to flat racing in April 2012. He previously endured a stint as a flat jockey in 1995 and has always held a dual licence. He came third in the jockeys' championship of 2014.

Cheltenham Festival winners (5) 

 Stayers' Hurdle - (1) Inglis Drever (2005)
 Supreme Novices' Hurdle - (1) Arcalis (2005)
 Baring Bingham Novices' Hurdle - (1) No Refuge (2005)
 Centenary Novices' Handicap Chase - (2) L'Antartique (2007), Divers (2011)

Major wins 
 Great Britain
 Ascot Gold Cup - (1) - Trip To Paris (2015)
 Nunthorpe Stakes - (1) - Alpha Delphini (2018)
 Betway Bowl - (1) Grey Abbey (2005)
 Mildmay Novices' Chase - (1) Aces Four (2007)
 Maghull Novices' Chase - (1)  Kalahari King (2009)

 Ireland
 Ryanair Novice Chase - (1)  Another Promise (2007)

References 

1975 births
Living people
Irish jockeys
People from Galway (city)
Sportspeople from County Galway